Phyllonotus pomum , the apple murex, is a species of large sea snail, a marine gastropod mollusk in the family Muricidae, the murex snails or rock snails.

Description
The size of an adult shell varies between 44 mm and 133 mm.

Original description of Lovell Augustus Reeve (published 1843):

The shell  is fusiformly oblong, thick, solid, very rough throughout, transversely conspicuously ridged, tuberculated between the varices ; three-varicose, varices tuberculated with a complicated mass of laminae ; fulvous or reddish brown, columella and interior of the aperture ochraceous yellow, columellar lip slightly wrinkled, edge erected, vividly stained, especially at the upper part, with very black brown ; outer lip strongly toothed, ornamented with three black-brown spots ; canal rather short, compressed, recurved."

Distribution
This species occurs in the Caribbean Sea, the Gulf of Mexico and the Lesser Antilles; in the Atlantic Ocean between North Carolina and Northern Brazil.

References

External links
 

Muricidae
Gastropods described in 1791